Purple Carrot is a Massachusetts-based, and 100% plant-based meal kit company. Purple Carrot offers both prepared meals as well as meal kits to subscribers weekly. As stated from an article in Cosmopolitan, “each Purple Carrot meal kit results in 72% less carbon being released into the atmosphere as compared to the standard American meal.” Purple Carrot was acquired by the Japanese meal-kit service Oisix ra daichi Inc. in May 2019 for $12.8 million.

About 
When founded in 2014, Purple Carrot was the first all plant-based meal kit service in the United States, coining the slogan of the "New American Diet".

Consumers can choose between two different packages. Either a three-night meal plan which serves two people ($68) or a two-night meal plan that serves four ($74). The meal prep times vary, depending on which meals are being cooked, but should fall within the 30-minute range.

In May 2022, Rishi Bhatia was appointed the new CEO of the company. Previously Bhatia was the Chief Technology Officer at Purple Carrot. Bhatia stated in an interview with Modern Retail “We want to continue to deliver unique flavors, but also increase our value proposition through convenience and flexibility, as cooking habits evolve."

References 

Online food ordering
American companies established in 2014
Retail companies established in 2014
Transport companies established in 2014
Internet properties established in 2014
2019 mergers and acquisitions